Budd is an English surname. Notable people with the surname include: 

Alan Budd (born 1937), British economist
Aoife Budd (born 1980), Irish cricketer
Barbara Budd (born 1953), Canadian actress
Brian Budd (born 1952), Canadian professional soccer player 
Bryan Budd (19772006), British soldier posthumously awarded the Victoria Cross
Christopher Budd (mathematician) (born 1960), British mathematician
Christopher Budd (cricketer) (born 1978), English cricketer
Christopher Budd (bishop) (born 1937), British Roman Catholic prelate
Colin Budd (born 1945), British civil servant and diplomat
Dave Budd (born 1938), American basketball player 
Edward G. Budd (18701946), American inventor and businessman
Eric Budd (19242006), English cricket administrator
Frank Budd (born 1939), American football player
Gardner Budd (19041976), Irish judge and senator
Harold Budd (1936–2020), American ambient/avant-garde composer
Herbert Ashwin Budd (1881–1950), British painter
James Budd (18511908), American lawyer and Democratic politician
Louis J. Budd (1921-2010), American literary critic and historian 
Nellie Moyer Budd (1860-1944), American music teacher
Ralph Budd (18791962), American railroad executive
Ruth Budd (19242021), Canadian bassist and member of the Symphony Six
Roy Budd (194793), British jazz musician and film composer
Sibylla Budd (born before 1999), Australian actress
Ted Budd (born 1971), American politician
Wayne Budd (born 1941), American executive and attorney
Una Budd (born 1975), Irish cricketer
Zola Budd (born 1966), South African-born British track and field athlete who competed in the Summer Olympic Games

Fictional characters
Title character of Herman Melville's novella Billy Budd, first published 1924
David Budd, main character of Bodyguard (UK TV series)